Dream is an EP by Cliff Richard and the Shadows, released in November 1961. It peaked at number 3 on both the Record Retailer and Melody Maker EP charts.

Release 
On the back of the success of "Theme for a Dream" (a top-three hit in March 1961), Richard decided to record several "dream" themed pop standards. Recorded in May at EMI Studios, these tracks were released as an EP, appropriately named Dream, in November 1961. Writing in the liner notes, James Wynn described Richard as "[adding] new dimensions to these time-tested favourites, giving them a freshness and vitality that brings them bang up to date. Such fine standards thoroughly deserve a new lease of life – and Cliff is just the right person to provide it".

Track listing

Personnel 

 Cliff Richard – vocals
 Hank Marvin – lead guitar
 Bruce Welch – rhythm guitar
 Jet Harris – bass guitar
 Tony Meehan – drums

Charts

References 

1961 EPs
EMI Records EPs
Cliff Richard albums
Albums produced by Norrie Paramor